Nebria tibialis is a species of ground beetle in the Nebriinae subfamily that is endemic to Italy.

Subspecies
The species have 3 subspecies all of which are endemic to Italy:
Nebria tibialis doderoi Banninger, 1924
Nebria tibialis subcontracta K. Daniel & J. Daniel, 1891
Nebria tibialis tibialis Bonelli, 1810

References

External links
Nebria tibialis at Fauna Europaea

tibialis
Beetles described in 1850
Beetles of Europe
Endemic fauna of Italy
Taxa named by Franco Andrea Bonelli